Eleni Tampasi (born 18 September 1976 in Tripoli) is a Greek judoka, who competed in the women's half-middleweight category. She picked up two Greek senior titles in her own division, and represented her home nation Greece at the 2004 Summer Olympics in Athens. Tampasi is also a full-fledged member of the judo squad for Ethnikos G.S. Athens.

Tampasi qualified for the Greek squad in the women's half-middleweight class (63 kg) at the 2004 Summer Olympics in Athens, by filling up an entry by the International Judo Federation and the Hellenic Olympic Committee, as Greece received an automatic berth for being the host nation. She lost her opening match to Belgium's Gella Vandecaveye, who successfully scored an ippon and gripped her on the tatami with a kuzure kami shiho gatame (broken upper four-quarter hold-down) assault at three minutes and twenty-two seconds.

References

External links

Hellenic Judo Federation Bio 

1976 births
Living people
Greek female judoka
Olympic judoka of Greece
Judoka at the 2004 Summer Olympics
Sportspeople from Tripoli, Greece
20th-century Greek women
21st-century Greek women